Giacomo Della Ratta was a Roman Catholic prelate who served as Archbishop of Benevento (1451–1460) and Archbishop of Rossano (1447–1451).

Biography
On 13 Oct 1451, Giacomo Della Ratta was appointed during the papacy of Pope Nicholas V as Archbishop of Benevento.
He served as Archbishop of Benevento until his resignation in 1460.

References

External links and additional sources
 (for Chronology of Bishops) 
 (for Chronology of Bishops) 

15th-century Roman Catholic archbishops in the Kingdom of Naples
Bishops appointed by Pope Nicholas V